The Diocese of Calgary is a Latin Church ecclesiastical territory or diocese of the Catholic Church in Alberta, Canada. The Diocese of Calgary is a suffragan diocese of the metropolitan Archdiocese of Edmonton.

Its cathedral episcopal see is St. Mary’s Cathedral, Calgary, Alberta.
It is currently led by Bishop William McGrattan.

History 
Established on 1912.11.30 as Diocese of Calgary, Latin adjective , on territory split off from the Diocese of Saint Albert.

Bishops

Diocesan ordinaries 
(all Roman Rite)
Suffragan Bishops of Calgary
 John Thomas McNally (1913.04.04 – 1924.08.12); later Bishop of Hamilton (Ontario, Canada) (1924.08.12 – 1937.02.17), Metropolitan Archbishop of Halifax (Canada) (1937.02.17 – death 1952.11.18)
 John Thomas Kidd (1925.02.06 – 1931.07.03), next Bishop of London (Ontario, Canada) (1931.07.03 – death 1950.06.02)
 Peter Joseph Monahan (1932.06.10 – 1935.06.26), next Metropolitan Archbishop of Regina (Canada) (1935.06.26 – death 1947.05.06)
  (1935.12.19 – retired 1966.12.28), emeritate as Titular Bishop of Horrea (1966.12.28 – death 1967.02.25)
Auxiliary bishop Joseph Lawrence Wilhelm (1963.06.25 – 1966.12.14), Titular Bishop of Saccæa (1963.06.25 – 1966.12.14); later Metropolitan Archbishop of Kingston (Canada) (1966.12.14 – retired 1982.03.12); died 1995
 Francis Joseph Klein (1967.02.25 – death 1968.02.03); previously Bishop of Saskatoon (Canada) (1952.02.28 – 1967.02.25)
  (1968.06.20 – retired 1998.01.19), died 2004
 Frederick Henry (1998.01.19 – retired 2017.01.04), previously Titular Bishop of Carinola (1986.04.18 – 1995.03.24) as Auxiliary Bishop of London (Canada) (1986.04.18 – 1995.03.24), Bishop of Thunder Bay (Canada) (1995.03.24 – 1998.01.19)
 William McGrattan (4 January 2017 – ...); previously Titular Bishop of Furnos minor (2009.11.06 – 2014.04.08) as Auxiliary Bishop of Toronto (Canada) (2009.11.06 – 2014.04.08), Bishop of Peterborough (Canada) (2014.04.08 – 2017.01.04).

Auxiliary bishop
 Joseph Lawrence Wilhelm (1963-1966), appointed Archbishop of Kingston

Statistics and extent 
It includes the Calgary Region, all of southern Alberta and the extreme lower half of the Alberta's Rockies region.

As per 2014 it pastorally served 538,000 Catholics (45.5% of 1,183,000 total) on 110,500 km² in 69 parishes with 158 priests (123 diocesan, 35 religious), 50 deacons, 166 lay religious (46 brothers, 120 sisters) and 10 seminarians.

The diocese contains 82+ parishes and missions specifically: 37 parishes in Calgary alone; of which, 10 are ethnic parishes, an additional university parish to serve the University of Calgary and 45+ parishes and missions designated for southern Alberta and the Rockies lower region. On December 3, 2017 Bishop McGrattan announced his intention to make Our Lady of the Rockies Parish in Canmore into a Diocesan Marian Shrine in the spring of 2019.

In 2006: 87 diocesan priests, 38 religious priests
427,200 Catholics.
110 women religious, 48 religious brothers and 30 permanent deacons make up the spiritual work force in Calgary not including the other regions.

Calgary city Parishes 

 Downtown:
St. Mary's Cathedral 
Sacred Heart
St. Francis of Assisi
 Northwest:
Ascension
Canadian Martyrs
Corpus Christi
Our Lady Queen of Peace (Polish)
Our Lady of the Assumption
St. Bernard
St. Boniface (German)
St. Joseph
St. Luke
St. Peter's
St. Pius X
University of Calgary Catholic Community
 Northeast
Our Lady of Grace (Italian & English)
Our Lady of Guadalupe (Spanish & English)
Our Lady of Perpetual Help (Chinese & English)
St. Mark
St. Thomas More
 Southwest
Holy Name
Holy Spirit (Spanish & English)
St. Anthony
St. Elizabeth of Hungary (Magyar-Hungarian)
Ste. Famille (French)
St. Gerard
St. James
St. Michael the Archangel
St. Mother Teresa Syro Malabar
 Southeast
Holy Trinity
Our Lady of Fatima (Portuguese & English)
Our Lady of Mt. Bistrica (Croatian & English)
St. Albert the Great
St. Anne (Korean)
St. Bernadette
St. Bonaventure
St. Cecilia's
St. John the Evangelist
St. Patrick's 
St. Vincent Liem (Vietnamese)

Rural Parishes and Missions 

Airdrie
St. Paul
Banff
St. Mary's
Beiseker
St. Mary's
Blairmore (Crowsnest Pass)
Holy Trinity
Bow Island
St. Michael's
Mission: Our Lady of Perpetual Help, Foremost
Brocket
St. Paul's
Brooks
St. Mary's
Canmore
Our Lady of the Rockies
Carstairs
St. Agnes Catholic Parish
Chestermere
St. Gabriel the Archangel
Claresholm
Christ the King
Mission: St. Cecilia, Nanton
Mission: St. Mary's, Champion

Cluny
St. Mary's
Coaldale
St. Ambrose
Cochrane
St. Mary's
Drumheller
St. Anthony
Fort Macleod
Holy Cross
Mission: St. Theresa, Cardston
Hanna
St. George's
High River
St. Francis de Sales
Mission: St. Andrew's, Vulcan
Lethbridge
Our Lady of the Assumption
St. Basil's
St. Patrick's
St. Martha
Medicine Hat
Holy Family
St. Patrick

Milk River
St. Peter
Mission: St. Isidore's, Allerston
Okotoks
St. James
Mission: St. Michael's, Black Diamond
Oyen
Sacred Heart
Picture Butte
St. Catherine's
Pincher Creek
St. Michael
Mission: Our Lady of Mt. Carmel, Waterton
Rockyford
St. Rita
Siksika Nation
Holy Trinity
Standoff
Immaculate Conception
Mission: four churches on the Blood Reserve
Strathmore
Sacred Heart
Taber
St. Augustine
Vauxhall
St. Joseph

See also 

 List of Catholic dioceses in Canada

References

Sources and external links
 
 GCatholic with Google map and - satellite photo
 Diocese of Calgary page at catholichierarchy.org retrieved July 14, 2006 
 Roman Catholic Archdiocese of Edmonton

Calgary
Organizations based in Calgary